Baughman Creek is a small stream located in Tillamook County, Oregon. The stream originates from two sources east of Oceanside and exits into the Pacific Ocean at Oceanside Beach State Recreation Site.

References

Rivers of Oregon
Rivers of Tillamook County, Oregon